Graveworm is an Italian extreme metal band from Brunico formed in 1992.

History
Before Graveworm even released a demo, they were signed by Serenades Records after a performance close to their hometown of Brunico, northern Italy.
Graveworm was signed to Serenades Records in 1997, releasing their first EP, Eternal Winds, in that same year. During their first tour together with Crematory, Therion and Lake of Tears, the band promoted the album When Daylight's Gone.

In 1998, the EP Underneath the Crescent Moon was released, featuring Sarah Jezebel Deva (Cradle of Filth, Therion) in the track "Awake...Thy Angels Of Sorrow". Graveworm also performed at the Wacken Open Air festival in Germany with bands such as Children of Bodom, Cradle of Filth and Vader.

The second album As the Angels Reach the Beauty was finished in 1999, and followed by a European tour with Agathodaimon. Scourge of Malice was released in 2001, which allowed the band their first headlining tour together with Dornenreich, Vintersorg and Darkwell. In 2002, they changed to the German Nuclear Blast label. At this point, Didi Schraffel (bass) left the band and Harry Klenk (guitars) was replaced by Eric Treffel. Treffel soon left the band in the same year and was replaced by Eric Righi on guitar.

Together with Righi, they produced Engraved in Black, which was finished in 2003, and enhanced with a feature of R.E.M.'s "Losing My Religion". Shortly after the release, Stefan Unterpertinger (guitar) quit and Lukas Flarer joined the band. Also, Harry Klenk, former guitarist and now bassist, re-joined the band.

In 2004, Graveworm played on the X-Mass Festival tour together with Destruction, Kataklysm, and many others. Martin Innerbichler (drums) took a break to study and was temporarily replaced by Moritz Neuner (previously the Darkwell and Shadowcast drummer).

The album (N)utopia was released in 2005.

Lukas Flarer (guitarist) later left the band for personal reasons, and was replaced by Orgler "Stirz" Thomas.

In 2006, Graveworm embarked on a North American tour with Kataklysm, Destruction, The Absence, and Vader.

On April 10, 2007, the promo of the latest Graveworm album, Collateral Defect, was leaked on the web. The album was launched in Europe on May 25 via Massacre Records and June 5 in North America through Nuclear Blast. It was produced by Andy Classen at Stage One studios in Borgentreich, Germany.

Graveworm's album Diabolical Figures was released on June 19, 2009 and features Karsten Jäger as a guest musician.

In 2011 Graveworm released album Fragments of Death.

In 2012 Thomas Orgler (guitar) and Sabine Mair (keyboard) quit and Stefan Unterpertinger (guitar) reunited with Graveworm.

On June 19, 2015, Graveworm released their 9th official studio album Ascending Hate.

The band is mentioned in Tony Vilgotsky's horror novel Shepherd of the Dead.

Members
Stefan Unterpertinger - guitars (1992-2003, 2012-present)
Stefan Fiori - vocals (1992-present)
Maschtl Innerbichler - drums (1995-2004, 2005-present)
Eric Righi - guitars (2001-present)
Florian Reiner - bass (2011-present)

Former members
Thomas Orgler - guitar (2005–2012)
Sabine Mair - keyboard (1997–2012)
Lukas Flarer - guitar (2003–2005)
Moritz Neuner - drums (2004-2005)
Didi Schraffel - bass (1997–2001)
Eric Treffel - guitar (2001)
Harry Klenk - guitar (1997-2001), Bass (2001-2011)

Timeline

Discography

Studio albums
1997: When Daylight's Gone
1999: As the Angels Reach the Beauty
2001: Scourge of Malice
2003: Engraved in Black
2005: (N)utopia
2007: Collateral Defect
2009: Diabolical Figures
2011: Fragments of Death
2015: Ascending Hate

References

External links

 
 
 Graveworm at Nuclear Blast
 
 Graveworm at Encyclopaedia Metallum

Italian black metal musical groups
German black metal musical groups
Musical groups established in 1992
Symphonic black metal musical groups
Massacre Records artists
Nuclear Blast artists